Rheydt is a borough of the German city Mönchengladbach, located in the west of North Rhine-Westphalia. Until 1918 and then again from 1933 (due to a split from Mönchengladbach arranged by Joseph Goebbels, who was born there) through 1975 it was an independent city.
After merging with Mönchengladbach, the central station (Rheydt Hauptbahnhof) kept its original name, making Mönchengladbach the only city in Germany to have two stations called Hauptbahnhof.

Schloss Rheydt, one of the best-preserved palaces of the Renaissance period, is located in Rheydt.

Mayors 1808–1974 
1808–1823: Dietrich Lenßen
1823–1857: Johann David Büschgens
1857–1877: Carl Theodorf von Velsen
1877–1893: Emil Pahlke
1893–1901: Dr. Wilhelm Strauß
1901–1905: Dr. Karl August Tettenborn
1906–1920: Paul Lehwald
1920–1929: Dr. Oskar Graemer
1929–1930: Franz Gielen
1930–1933: Dr. Johannes Handschumacher
1933: Wilhelm Pelzer
1934–1936: Edwin Renatus Robert August Hasenjaeger
1936–1940: Heinz Gebauer
1940–1945: Dr. Alexander Doemens
1945: August Brocher
1945–1948: Dr. Carl Marcus
1948–1950: Heinrich Pesch
1950–1956: Johannes Scheulen
1956–1961: Wilhelm Schiffer
1961–1963: Dr. Friedrich Hinnah
1963–1964: Fritz Rahmen
1964–1969: Wilhelm Schiffer
1969–1974: Fritz Rahmen

Demographic development 

Note: ¹ - census

Notable residents 
1815, May 15, Friedrich Beckenbach, renamed Brookland + Jan 28 1892 in Rheydt, textile entrepreneur in Prussia, Holland and Yorkshire England, son of Johann Heinrich Beckenbach of Lenssen & Beckenbach, Rheydt
1859, February 3, Hugo Junkers, † February 3, 1935 in Gauting, engineer
1863, May 30, Klara Hechtenberg Collitz, † November 22, 1944 in Baltimore, German philologist
1876, September 4, Ernst Jakob Christoffel, † April 23, 1955 in Isfahan, founder of the Christoffel-Blindenmission
1894, August 29, Werner Gilles, † June 22, 1961 in Essen, artist
1894, February 24, Josef Arndgen, † September 20, 1966 in Wiesbaden, German politician (CDU)
1897, October 29, Joseph Goebbels, † May 1, 1945 in Berlin, Minister for Public Enlightenment and Propaganda during the Nazi regime
1898, July 24, Peter Erkens, † October 22, 1972 in Mönchengladbach, politician
1910, Emil Vorster, † 1976, race driver
1913, December 18, Wilhelm Schmitter, † November 8, 1943 in action over London, World War II Luftwaffe bomber pilot
1917, June 2, Heinz Sielmann, † October 6, 2006 in Munich, film maker
1918, May 6, Ruth Lommel,† 22 June 2012, actress
1919, June 3, Herbert Huppertz † June 8, 1944 Caen, Killed in Airbattle with American fighters. German Ace on FW 190 with 78 kills 
1925, A. Edward Nussbaum, † 31 October 2009 in St. Louis, Missouri, theoretical mathematician
1928, April 1, Hermin Esser, tenor, † 2009 in Wiesbaden, 
1930, May 16, Karl Heinz Beckurts, † July 9, 1986 in Straßlach, Munich, physicist, killed by Red Army Faction
1932, August 25, Alexander Arnz, † September 30, 2004 in Cologne, director
1936, August 9, Uwe Erichsen, author
1949, November 24, Christa Muth, systems scientist
1967, May 18, Heinz-Harald Frentzen, race driver
1973, February 24, Sonja Oberem, marathon runner
1977, May 10, Nick Heidfeld, race driver

References

External links

Rheydt-Online - a city guide to Rheydt

Mönchengladbach
Former municipalities in North Rhine-Westphalia